Outtake TV is a blooper show originally hosted by Paul O'Grady, then by Anne Robinson and finally by Rufus Hound. The show replaced BBC One's original blooper show Auntie's Bloomers and consisted of various clips past and present of bloopers from TV and film. Various special episodes were aired, consisting mainly of clips from one programme, most notably EastEnders and The Weakest Link.

External links

2000s British comedy television series
2010s British comedy television series
2002 British television series debuts
2011 British television series endings
Blooper shows